Mikhaylovskaya is a rural locality (a stanitsa) and the administrative center of Mikhaylovskoye Rural Settlement, Uryupinsky District, Volgograd Oblast, Russia. The population was 1,118 as of 2010. There are 28 streets.

Geography 
Mikhaylovskaya is located in forest steppe, 24 km northwest of Uryupinsk (the district's administrative centre) by road. Sadkovsky is the nearest rural locality.

References 

Rural localities in Uryupinsky District